Al-Qaeda in the Indian Subcontinent  usually abbreviated as AQIS, is an Islamist militant organization which aims to fight the governments of Pakistan, Afghanistan, India, Myanmar and Bangladesh in order to establish an Islamic state and seeks to establish an Islamic caliphate in Indian Subcontinent.

The militant group has also stated its intentions to attack American targets in the Indian subcontinent. This group is listed as a terrorist organization by the United Nations, United States, Canada, India and Pakistan.

History

Before Al Qaeda in the Indian Subcontinent
Before coming together under AQIS, there were various jihadist factions operating in Pakistan, India, Bangladesh, and Afghanistan. One of these factions operated in Karachi, Pakistan, and were responsible for numerous attacks in the city. On 11 December 2014, AQIS issued a report detailing these attacks. The attacks targeted local police, a professor, and a blogger.

As Al Qaeda in the Indian Subcontinent
On 3 September 2014, Ayman al-Zawahiri, leader of al-Qaeda, announced the establishment of a new branch in the Indian subcontinent in a 55-minute video posted online. During the announcement, Zawahiri stated that it had taken two years to gather various jihadist factions into the new group, and introduced Asim Umar, an Indian national and a former commander of Tehrik-i-Taliban Pakistan (TTP), as its Emir. The announcement also introduced the group's spokesman, Usama Mahmoud, who praised militant commanders like Amjad Farooqi, Ilyas Kashmiri and Hassan Ghul. Farooqi was killed by Pakistani security forces. Kashmiri and Ghul were killed by US drone strikes in Pakistan.

On 11 December 2014, Pakistani police arrested Shahid Usman, the head of the al-Qaeda wing in Karachi, and four others in Karachi along with weapons and 10 kg of explosives. Ustad Ahmad Farooq, the deputy emir for AQIS, was killed on 15 January 2015 following a US drone strike in South Waziristan. Qari ‘Imran, a member of the group’s ruling Shura Council, was killed on 5 January 2015 in a drone strike in North Waziristan.

In July 2018, United States designated Asim Umar a global terrorist.

Despite Zawahiri's announcement, Al Qaeda could not succeed in making any direct presence in India. Although some Kashmiris were arrested for assisting al Qaeda in the country, there is no evidence of any organized presence of the group in the region. Specifically, there has been no record of territorial claim, group activity or kidnapping of civilian or government officials by Al Qaeda. Some experts also suggest that Al Qaeda have links with some local Kashmiri factionist groups to spread insurgency in the Indian state of Jammu & Kashmir. Indian Prime Minister Narendra Modi told CNN in an interview with Fareed Zakaria that Indian Muslims would not be allied with Al Qaeda because of their patriotism, modernity and literacy.

On 23 September 2019, Afghan officials announced that they had killed Asim Umar, the head of al-Qaeda in the Indian subcontinent, during a joint US-Afghan military raid in Helmand province of Afghanistan. 40 Afghan civilians and 6 other Al-Qaeda militants were also killed in this raid.

Relations with other Jihadist factions
In October, a Kashmiri militant group calling itself "Ansar ut-Tawhid wal Jihad in Kashmir" published a video expressing support for Al Qaeda in the Indian Subcontinent. The group offered to provide shelter to foreign fighters within AQIS as well as fight alongside it.

AQIS spokesman Usama Mahmoud, in series of tweets, expressed support for militant groups in Chechnya, Dagestan, and Yemen. He also gave a eulogy for al-Shabaab leader Ahmed Abdi Godane, who was killed in a US drone strike.

Media
On 19 October 2014, a 117-page English-language magazine called Resurgence was released online. It was produced by the Subcontinent branch of Al Qaeda's As-Sahab media production house, and the articles focused on waging jihad in the Indian Subcontinent.

Statements
Al Qaeda in the Indian Subcontinent has released multiple statements, mainly via the Twitter account of Usama Mahmoud, the group's spokesperson.

On 13 September 2014, Usama Mahmoud claimed responsibility for the attempted raid on a Pakistani naval frigate and the assassination of Pakistani Brigadier Zahoor Ahmad Fazal in Punjab Province. On 17 September, Mahmoud released a statement which justified the attempted attack on the Pakistani frigate, stating that America was the primary enemy of AQIS. On September 30, AQIS released another statement which said that the intended targets were the American and Indian navies.

On 14 October 2014, Mahmoud confirmed that AQIS senior leader Imran Ali Siddiqi was killed in a US drone strike. He also spoke about the US-led coalition in Iraq and Syria. Siddiqi was a member of the group's Shura council.

On 4 November 2014, Mahmoud released a series of tweets that condemned what he said as the "Infidel System." He also prayed for god to support militants in Chechnya, Dagestan, and Yemen, as well as Iraq and Syria. The following day, Mahmoud released a statement giving condolences for the killing of Somali al-Qaeda leader Ahmed Abdi Godane. He directed a statement to Somali fighters which said that the US must be fought.

AQIS released an audio message from its leader, Asim Umar, on 10 November 2014. Umar eulogized AQIS Shura Council member Imran Ali Siddiqi, who was killed in a US drone strike in the Federally Administered Tribal Areas.

On 20 November 2014, AQIS spokesman Usama Mahmoud released a statement confirming the death of two officials of the group in a US raid on the border between Pakistan and Afghanistan. One of the officials owned the house that Khalid Sheikh Mohammed lived in when he was captured. Four days later, Mahmoud gave a eulogy for the two officials, and urged Pakistani doctors and military officers to follow their example.

On 5 December 2014, AQIS published a photo showing the two officials who were killed in the US raid on the Afghan-Pakistani border, as well as a photo of the deceased son of one of the officials.

On 20 December 2014, Usama Mahmoud, spokesman for AQIS, condemned an attack on a school in Peshawar, Pakistan, which was carried out by the Pakistani Taliban. He said that the attack was un-Islamic and that "the massacre of innocent children makes our hearts burst."

On 7 June 2022, AQIS threatened suicide attacks in Gujarat, Uttar Pradesh, Mumbai and Delhi to "fight for the dignity of our Prophet" amid brewing controversy over the remarks by BJP leaders on the founder of Islam.

Claimed, alleged and repudiated attacks 
As of now, AQIS have carried out multiple terrorist attacks in Pakistan and Bangladesh -
The group took responsibility for the 2 September 2014 assassination of Brigadier Fazal Zahoor, a senior officer in the Pakistani Army, who was shot dead by men riding motorcycles.
Spokesman Usama Mahmoud claimed responsibility for a 6 September 2014 attack on a Naval dockyard in Karachi, reportedly carried out by former Pakistan Navy officers, who unsuccessfully tried to hijack a F-22P frigate. Three attackers were killed and seven were arrested by Pakistani forces.
Spokesman Usama Mahmoud condemned on 20 December 2014 the Peshawar school attack.
 In video released on 2 May 2015, AQIS claimed responsibility for the death of four Bangladeshi bloggers; Avijit Roy, Oyasiqur Rahman Babu, Ahmed Rajib Haider and AKM Shafiul Islam. They also claimed responsibility for killing two Pakistani citizens, Dr Shakil Auj and blogger Aneeqa Naz. They mentioned Indian Prime Minister, Narendra Modi.
 On 7 April 2016, AQIS claimed responsibility for the stabbing death of a blogger in Bangladesh by some Islamist militias. 
 On 25 April 2016, AQIS claimed responsibility for the death of an LGBT activist in Dhaka, Bangladesh.

Criticism
The group has been condemned by other Muslim religious and political organizations including the Association of Indian Muslims, Indian American Muslim Council, Indian Minorities Advocacy Network, Indian Muslim Educational Foundation of North America, Indian Muslim Relief and Charities, Muslim Youth Awareness Alliance in India, and the Hefazat-e-Islam Bangladesh and Khelafat Majlish in Bangladesh and Burmese Muslim Association in Myanmar. A spokesman for Hefazat-e-Islam Bangladesh added: There is prevailing a congenial and peaceful environment in Bangladesh. People are living in peace and in such a situation the announcement by Al Qaeda chief Zawahiri has made the people fearful and worried. Bangladesh had experienced earlier militant activities and terrorism by Jamaat-ul-Mujahideen Bangladesh and Harkat-ul-Jihad al-Islami. But they could not emerge successful and Al Qaeda would not come out successful in Bangladesh despite their announcement.

See also 
 al-Qaeda
 Shakil Auj
 Ansar Ghazwat-ul-Hind

References

External links
Counter Extremism Project profile

Anti-communist organizations
Branches of al-Qaeda
Jihadist groups in Bangladesh
Jihadist groups in India
Jihadist groups in Pakistan
Organisations designated as terrorist by India
Organizations designated as terrorist by the United States
Organizations designated as terrorist by Canada
Organisations designated as terrorist by Pakistan
Organizations based in Asia designated as terrorist